The yellow-sided opossum (Monodelphis dimidiata) is an opossum species from South America. It is found in Argentina, Brazil and Uruguay. They have grey or black fur on their dorsal side with yellowish fur on the lateral side that continues down to the feet. They are the most mysterious of all the Monodelphis that is found specifically in the Pampean region or Pampa of Argentina. It is suspected to be a once-in-a-lifetime breeder as seen in a three-year observational study of one population in the marshy grasslands of the Pampean region. Maintaining their native grasslands is important for them to keep a stable population.
They show sexual dimorphism in overall size: adult males are typically 100-150 g whereas adult females are 30-70 g.

Behavior
This species displays a rich repertoire of stereotyped behaviors. Postures, locomotion, and grooming seem to be similar to those described for other didelphids. They can carry nest materials using their short but still prehensile tails.

Both males and females hunt insects and small vertebrates and show specialized behavior for dealing with particular preys. Attacks and initial consumption are initially directed typically towards the head of the prey, especially for large insects. However, hairy caterpillars are not immediately grabbed; instead, several rounds of scratching over the stinging hairs are performed before the prey is eaten. Small mice are chased and attacked until a firm bite at the neck is attained. They then hold the neck bite until the mouse dies. M. dimidiata is thought to be a miniature analog to the marsupial sabertooths Thylacosmilus. Like extinct sabertooth predators, it has one of the largest canines of any marsupial relative to body size and was proposed as a living model to test hypotheses about hunting strategies of the extinct predators.

Yellow-sided opossums also show a variety of behaviors used in social contexts, including male-to-male agonistic rituals, and a variety of vocalizations whose social or adaptive significance deserves further investigation.

References

Opossums
Marsupials of South America
Mammals of Brazil
Mammals of Argentina
Mammals of Uruguay
Mammals described in 1847